Eleven Mile State Park is a Colorado State Park located in Park County,  south of Lake George, Colorado, United States. Facilities include a marina, a visitors center and over 300 campsites. Fish species include cutthroat, rainbow, brown trout and northern pike. Eleven Mile Reservoir is famous for the thriving Kokanee salmon population found in the river current along the north side of the reservoir known as the Dream Stream. This reservoir is also known for being very windy in the afternoon. A required daily vehicle park pass can be obtained at the entrance of the park. Daily species possession limits are as follows: trout, 4 total, two over 16" and two under 16", or four under 16"; salmon, 10; pike and crawdads, unlimited. Cottontail rabbit, white-tailed jackrabbit, coyote, muskrat and ground squirrels are commonly seen in the park. Mule deer, pronghorn, porcupine, badger, black bear and elk are seen occasionally.

References

External links

 
 CO State Park map of Eleven Mile Reservoir

State parks of Colorado
Protected areas of Park County, Colorado
Protected areas established in 1970
1970 establishments in Colorado